Anthony Holles may refer to:

 Anthony Holles (figure skater) (born 1939), former British pair skater
 Anthony Holles (actor) (1901–1950), British film actor